Ghost is a free and open source blogging platform written in JavaScript and distributed under the MIT License, designed to simplify the process of online publishing for individual bloggers as well as online publications.

The concept of the Ghost platform was first floated publicly in November 2012 in a blog post by project founder John O'Nolan, which generated enough response to justify coding a prototype version with collaborator Hannah Wolfe.

The first public version of Ghost, released October 2013, was financed by a successful Kickstarter campaign which achieved its initial funding goal of £25,000 in 11 hours and went on to raise a final total of £196,362 during the 29-day campaign.

History
The idea for the Ghost platform was first written about at the start of November 2012, in a blog post by project founder John O'Nolan, the former deputy lead for the WordPress User Interface team, after becoming frustrated with the complexity of using WordPress as a blog rather than a content management system.

Following considerable demand and positive feedback from the community on the initial blog post, O'Nolan recruited long-time friend Hannah Wolfe to help him create an initial prototype of the platform.

On April 29, 2013 – O'Nolan released a video of the prototype in a crowdfunding campaign on Kickstarter with a goal of £25,000 to fund the completion of initial development work. The project was successfully funded in 11 hours and went on to raise a final total of £196,362 during the 29-day campaign. The project relied on backing both from individuals as well as sponsorship from companies who had an interest in seeing the platform succeed. Notable backers included Seth Godin, Leo Babauta, Darren Rowse, Tucker Max, major companies such as Woo-Themes, Envato, and Microsoft.

On September 19, 2013 – The first public version of Ghost was released, named Kerouac as an early release to people who had backed the Kickstarter campaign.

On October 14, 2013 – Ghost was made available for the first time as an extended-release to the general public via GitHub as of version 0.3.3 – amended with bugfixes and security updates.

Some notable platform users include IBM, Tinder, Sky News, VEVO, and Zappos.

Ghost Foundation 
The Ghost project is managed by a nonprofit organization headquartered in Singapore called the Ghost Foundation, which was established following the Kickstarter campaign. The foundation currently employs 25 full-time members of staff to work on the Ghost project and the surrounding community infrastructure.

Business model
The Ghost blogging software is free to download and use. In addition, the Foundation offers a paid hosted platform for users who would like to run a live blog on the World Wide Web, as an alternative to configuring a server and running a manual install of the software package. For a monthly fee, users receive an account with fully managed Ghost blogs with automatic backups and updates as well as email support. As the hosted platform is owned and operated by the Ghost Foundation, all revenue generated from the service is subsequently used to fund further development of the open source software and the project's infrastructure.

Platform
Ghost is coded in Node.js, a server-side JavaScript execution engine, and an Ember.js admin client. Since version 2.0, posts can be written using a WYSIWYG editor; in earlier versions, only Markdown was supported. Ghost CMS (Content Management System) can be used as either a traditional or headless CMS.

Security
On May 3, 2020, Ghost confirmed that its Ghost(Pro) platform was infected with crypto-mining malware. The virus affected both Ghost(Pro) servers and Ghost.org billing services. No user data was compromised, and user credentials were not stored in plain text.

See also 

 List of content management systems

 Weblog software

References

External links

Blog software
Free software programmed in JavaScript
Kickstarter-funded software
Blog hosting services
Free content management systems